Reedops is an extinct genus of phacopid trilobite.

References

Phacopidae
Phacopida genera
Early Devonian animals
Early Devonian extinctions